Sharangapani is a popular epithet of the Hindu god Vishnu. It means "one who holds the Sharanga bow in his hand".

Sharangapani may also refer to:

 Sarangapani Temple, a temple of Vishnu
 P. K. Sarangapani (1925–2011), Malayalam screenwriter and playwright
 Thamizhavel G. Sarangapani, founder of the Tamil Murasu